Khvartikuni is a rural locality (a selo) and the administrative centre of Khvartikuninsky Selsoviet, Gergebilsky District, Republic of Dagestan, Russia. The population was 1,323 as of 2010. There are 12 streets.

Geography 
Khvartikuni is located 10 km southwest of Gergebil (the district's administrative centre) by road. Kurmi and Khvarada are the nearest rural localities.

References 

Rural localities in Gergebilsky District